is a Prefectural Natural Park in Wakayama Prefecture, Japan. Established in 1971, the park spans the borders of the municipalities of Shirahama and Tanabe. The park's central feature is the eponymous .

See also
 National Parks of Japan
 List of Places of Scenic Beauty of Japan (Wakayama)

References

External links
  Map of Hikigawa Prefectural Natural Park

Parks and gardens in Wakayama Prefecture
Shirahama, Wakayama
Tanabe, Wakayama
Protected areas established in 1971
1971 establishments in Japan